{{DISPLAYTITLE:Omega2 Cygni}}

Omega2 Cygni, Latinized from ω2 Cygni, is the Bayer designation for a solitary star in the northern constellation of Cygnus. It has an apparent visual magnitude of 5.5, which is faintly visible to the naked eye on a dark night. Based upon an annual parallax shift of 8.17 mas, it is located roughly 399 light years from the Sun. At that distance, the visual magnitude is diminished by an extinction factor of 0.08 due to interstellar dust.

This is a red giant star on the asymptotic giant branch, with a stellar classification of M2 III. It is a suspected variable star, although the evidence is considered "doubtful or erroneous". If it does exist, the variability is small with an amplitude of 0.05 magnitude and a timescale of around 30 days. There is a 58.3% chance that this star is a member of the Hercules stream.

See also
Omega1 Cygni

References

Suspected variables
M-type giants
Double stars
Cygni, Omega2
Cygnus (constellation)
Durchmusterung objects
Cygni, 46
195774
101243
7851